Hits Radio Pride is a national digital radio station owned and operated by Bauer as part of the Hits Radio network. It broadcasts across the United Kingdom. It was launched on 28 August 2020 as a pop up Pride station focusing on music for the LGBT community.

The station was sponsored by Cooperative Bank for an initial run of 6 months. Additional content is produced by Reform Radio, as part of a grant awarded by the Audio Content Fund. Tough Talks’; is an 'intimate conversations between contributors from the LGBTQ+ community reflecting on the struggles that they face within society.' 

Hits Radio Pride also works with LGBT+ helpline Switchboard (UK) to promote support services.

History 
On 29 July 2020, Bauer announced it was to launch a spinoff pop-up station under the Hits Radio brand.

Hits Radio Pride launched at 8:00AM on 28 August 2020. Its output is similar to its sister station Hits Radio UK,  with a particular focus on artists and musicians loved by the LGBTQ+ community.

The concept for the station was first proposed in February 2020 by Ross Tilley, working across Bauer's Northern Ireland radio stations.

DAB availability 
The service is available on a select number of Bauer owned ensembles including Northern Ireland, Liverpool, Swansea, Bradford and Huddersfield, South Yorkshire, Humberside, Stoke and London.

References

External links
 Official website

Hits Radio
Bauer Radio
Bauer Group (UK)
Radio stations established in 2020
LGBT-related radio stations
2020s LGBT-related mass media